The XIX Memorial of Hubert Jerzy Wagner was a volleyball tournament held at Tauron Arena in Kraków, Poland from 18 to 20 August 2022. It was held a week before the 2022 FIVB Volleyball Men's World Championship.

Like the previous editions, four teams participated in the tournament. Volleyball Nations League bronze medalist Poland, Asian champions Iran, Olympic bronze medalist winner Argentina and European champion Serbia.

Qualification
All teams except the host must have received an invitation from the organizers.

Results
All times are local Central European Summer Time (UTC+2).

Ranking

|}

|}

Final standing

Awards

Most Valuable Player
  Jakub Kochanowski
Best Setter
  Marcin Janusz
Best Server
  Saber Kazemi
Best Receiver
  Kamil Semeniuk

Best Blocker
  Jakub Kochanowski
Best Spiker
  Ezequiel Palacios
Best Libero
  Nikola Peković

References

External links

Official website (Polish)

Memorial of Hubert Jerzy Wagner
Sports competitions in Kraków
Memorial of Hubert Jerzy Wagner
Memorial of Hubert Jerzy Wagner
Memorial of Hubert Jerzy Wagner
21st century in Kraków
International volleyball competitions hosted by Poland